Cathepsin S is a protein that in humans is encoded by the CTSS gene. Transcript variants utilizing alternative polyadenylation signals exist for this gene.

Cathepsin S is a member of the peptidase C1 family of cysteine cathepsins, a lysosomal cysteine protease that may participate in the degradation of antigenic proteins to peptides for presentation to the MHC class II. Cathepsin S can function as an elastase over a broad pH range in alveolar macrophages.

Function 
Cathepsin S is a lysosomal enzyme that belongs to the papain-like protease of cysteine proteases. While a role in antigen presentation has long been recognized, it is now understood that cathepsin S has a role in itch and pain, or nociception. The nociceptive activity results from cathepsin S functioning as a signaling molecule via activation of protease-activated receptors 2 and 4 members of the G-protein coupled receptor family.

Cathepsin S is expressed by antigen presenting cells including macrophages, B-lymphocytes, dendritic cells and microglia. Cathepsin S is expressed by some epithelial cells. Its expression is markedly increased in human keratinocytes following stimulation with interferon-gamma and its expression is elevated in psoriatic keratinocytes due to stimulation by proinflammatory factors. In contrast, cortical thymic epithelial cells do not express cathepsin S.

While pH optima of many lysosomal proteases are acidic, cathepsin S is an exception. This enzyme remains catalytically active under the neutral pH and has pH optimum between the pH values 5.0 and 7.5. Many lysosomal proteases are trapped inside the lysosome due to a problem with their stability. In contrast, cathepsin S remains stable and has a physiological role outside the lysosome. Immune cells, including macrophages and microglia, secrete cathepsin S in response to inflammatory mediators including lipopolysaccharides, proinflammatory cytokines and neutrophils. In vitro, cathepsin S retains some enzyme activity in the presence of 3M urea. Cathepsin S is produced as a zymogen and is activated by processing.

The activity of cathepsin S is tightly regulated by its endogenous inhibitor, cystatin C, which also has a role in antigen presentation. Cystatin A and B have a lower activity compared to cystatin C.

The active cleavage sites -(-Val-Val-Arg-)- of cathepsin S are supposed to have at least two amino acids surrounding it from each side.

While lysosomal proteases terminally degrade proteins in lysosomes, cathepsin S has own distinctive physiological role.

Role in antigen presentation 

This enzyme has a critical role in antigen presentation. Major histocompatibility complex class II molecules interact with small peptide fragments for presentation on the surface of antigen-presenting immune cells. Cathepsin S participates in the degradation of the invariant or Ii chain that prevents loading the antigen into the complex. This degradation occurs in the lysosome. Chronologically, action of cathepsin S follows two cleavages performed by aspartyl proteases. Cathepsin S cleaves the remaining fragment of Ii (IiP1) and leaves a small part of Ii known as CLIP which stays directly associated with the complex.

Proteolytic degradation of Ii is important since it facilitates dissociation of CLIP from MHC II and then, complex can load the selected antigen. After loading the antigen, MHC II molecule moves to the cell surface.  Thus, we can speculate that overexpression of cathepsin S may lead to premature degradation of Ii, occasional loading of MHC II and an autoimmune attack. Contrary, inhibition of cathepsin S will lead to a delay in degradation of Ii and loading the antigen into MHC II as well as inappropriate presence of uncleaved Li-fragments in MHC II on the cell surface. It will impair and weaken the immune response. For instance, this kind of MHC II will not be very efficient to induce proliferation of T-cells.

In macrophages, cathepsin S can be replaced by cathepsin F.

Role in degradation of ECM 

Secreted cathepsin S cleaves some extracellular matrix (ECM) proteins. Cathepsin S may be considered the most potent elastase known. The list of proposed cathepsin S substrates includes laminin, fibronectin elastin, osteocalcin and some collagens. It also cleaves chondroitin sulfate, heparan sulfate and proteoglycans of the basal membrane. Cathepsin S plays an active role in blood vessels permeability and angiogenesis due to its elastolytic and collagenolytic activities. For instance, cleavage of laminin-5 by cathepsin S leads to generation of proangiogenic peptides. The expression of cathepsin S can be triggered by proinflammatory factors secreted by tumor cells.

In tumorogenesis, cathepsin S promotes a tumor growth.

Role in cytokine regulation 

Cathepsin S expression and activity has also been shown to be upregulated in the skin of psoriasis patients. Whether it has a definitive role in causing the pathology of psoriasis is as yet unknown, however in the same study it was shown to specially cleave and activate the psoriasis-associated proinflammatory cytokine IL-36γ

Nociception 

Cathepsin S has a role in nociception, including itch and gastrointestinal pain. The mechanism by which cathepsin S leads to itch and pain is consistent with the capacity of this cysteine protease to activate protease-activated receptors 2 and 4.

Cathepsin S inhibitors 

Synthetic inhibitors of cathepsin S participated in numerous preclinical studies for the immune disorders including rheumatoid arthritis. Currently, at least one of them participates in a clinical trial for psoriasis. 
LHVS (morpholinurea-leucine-homophenylalanine-vinylsulfone-phenyl) is the most extensively studied synthetic inhibitor of cathepsin S. IC50 of LHVS is about 5 nM. Inhibition of cathepsin S by LHVS has shown to be neuroprotective after traumatic brain injury. The list of commercial inhibitors also includes paecilopeptin (acetyl-Leu-Val-CHO) and some others.

Clinical significance 

Cathepsin S has been shown to be a significant prognostic factor for patients with type IV astrocytomas (glioblastoma multiforme), and its inhibition has shown improvement in survival time by mean average 5 months. This is because the cysteine enzyme can no longer act together with other proteases to break up the brain extracellular matrix. So the spread of the tumor is halted. Scientists have just announced that this enzyme predicts death, as it has been shown to be associated with both heart disease and cancer. (citation?)

See also 
Cathepsin

References

Further reading

External links 
 The MEROPS online database for peptidases and their inhibitors: C01.034
 
 

Proteases
EC 3.4.22